Celeste de Longpré Heckscher née Massey (23 February 1860 – 18 February 1928) was an American composer.

Life
Celeste de Longpré Massey was born in Philadelphia, Pennsylvania, the daughter of Robert Valentine Massey Jr. and Julia Whitney Pratt Massey. She began composing at the age of ten but her parents objected to her study of music. She married banker and steel merchant John Austin Stevens Heckscher in 1883 and had four children.

After her marriage, Heckscher studied composition with Henry Albert Lang and orchestration with Wasili Leps in Philadelphia, and later continued her studies in Europe. In 1913 Heckscher gave a concert of her own compositions in New York City at the Aeolian Hall. In 1918 she premiered her opera The Rose of Destiny at the Metropolitan Opera House in Philadelphia as a fund-raiser for the Red Cross. She was active in and served as president of the Philadelphia Operatic Society for a number of years. She died in Germantown, Philadelphia.

Works
Selected works include:
The Rose of Destiny, opera
The Flight of Time, opera
The Norse Maiden's Lament
To the Forest, opera
Impromptu, for piano
Au Fond, for piano
Valse Bohême, book of seven songs
Romance for cello
Dances of the Pyrenees, orchestral suite and ballet

References

1860 births
1928 deaths
19th-century classical composers
20th-century classical composers
American women classical composers
American classical composers
19th-century American composers
20th-century American women musicians
20th-century American musicians
20th-century American composers
20th-century women composers
19th-century women composers
19th-century American women musicians